Ratu Henry Vao'ofu Speight (born 24 March 1988) is a Fiji-born Australian professional rugby union player. He currently plays for the French club Biarritz. Speight was previously with the Brumbies and Queensland Reds in Super Rugby, and has represented Australia with the Wallabies and national sevens team. His playing position is wing or centre.

Early life and career
Henry Speight is the son of Fijian politician Samisoni Tikoinasau and the grandson of former Fiji President, Ratu Josefa Iloilo. He was born in Suva, Fiji, where he attended Queen Victoria School before moving to New Zealand for his final years of high school.

His first taste of pro-rugby came in his final year at Hamilton Boys High School, when he was picked for Waikato, making his debut against the Bay of Plenty in 2008. Speight went on to represent the province over four seasons. Not eligible for the New Zealand Schoolboys, Speight represented his native Fiji in the same year at the Junior World Cup in Belfast.

Super Rugby and Australia
Speight made his Brumbies debut during the 2011 Super Rugby season against the Chiefs in Canberra. After becoming eligible for national selection, on 11 September 2014, Speight made his Wallabies debut during the 2014 Spring Tour against Ireland.

In early 2018 Speight signed with Australia for at least one more year, showing his dedication to Australian rugby despite offers of contracts by foreign clubs.

After signing a short deal in late 2018 with Ulster as a temporary replacement for the injured Louis Ludik, he returned to the Brumbies for the 2019 season before joining the Queensland Reds for the 2020 season. Speight's first game was against his old team, the Brumbies. He scored a try in that match to officially make him the only player to have scored tries against all 18 (current and former) super rugby teams.

Speight then moved to France on a 3-year contract with Biarritz Olympique.

Super Rugby statistics

References

External links

1988 births
Living people
Fijian rugby union players
Australia international rugby union players
Rugby union wings
Biarritz Olympique players
ACT Brumbies players
Canberra Vikings players
Waikato rugby union players
Fijian expatriate rugby union players
Expatriate rugby union players in France
Fijian expatriate sportspeople in France
Sportspeople from Suva
People educated at Queen Victoria School (Fiji)
People educated at Hamilton Boys' High School
I-Taukei Fijian people
Fijian people of British descent
Ulster Rugby players
Fijian expatriate sportspeople in Australia
Fijian expatriates in New Zealand
Expatriate rugby union players in Australia
Naturalised citizens of Australia
Fijian expatriate sportspeople in Northern Ireland
Australian expatriate sportspeople in Northern Ireland
Expatriate rugby union players in Northern Ireland
Australian expatriate rugby union players
Australian expatriate sportspeople in France
Naturalised sports competitors